Przygodzice  is a village in Ostrów Wielkopolski County, Greater Poland Voivodeship, in west-central Poland. It is the seat of the gmina (administrative district) called Gmina Przygodzice.

The village has a population of 3,000.

References

Villages in Ostrów Wielkopolski County